The Brady Hays Homestead was a historic farmstead in rural northern White County, Arkansas.  The property included a house and barn built about 1885 by Brady Hays.  The house was a double pen frame house of vernacular style, and the barn was a notably large two story transverse crib design, incorporating an older barn into its structure.

The property was listed on the National Register of Historic Places in 1991.  It was reported to be destroyed by fire in 2007, and it has been listed as destroyed in the Arkansas Historic Preservation Program database.

See also
National Register of Historic Places listings in White County, Arkansas

References

Houses on the National Register of Historic Places in Arkansas
Houses completed in 1885
Houses in White County, Arkansas
National Register of Historic Places in White County, Arkansas
Farms on the National Register of Historic Places in Arkansas
1885 establishments in Arkansas
2007 disestablishments in Arkansas
Burned buildings and structures in the United States